The 2012 WNBA season is the 14th season for the Minnesota Lynx of the Women's National Basketball Association. The Lynx were the defending WNBA Champions, having won the 2011 WNBA Finals over the Atlanta Dream. The Lynx qualified for the playoffs, and finished with the best record in the WNBA. On October 7, 2012, the Lynx won their second straight WNBA Western Conference championship, earning a spot in the 2012 WNBA finals.

Transactions

WNBA Draft
The following are the Lynx' selections in the 2012 WNBA Draft.

Transaction log
April 11, 2011: The Lynx acquired a second-round pick in the 2012 Draft from the Atlanta Dream as part of the Felicia Chester/Rachel Jarry transaction.
April 11, 2011: The Lynx acquired a second-round pick in the 2012 Draft from the New York Liberty as part of the Jessica Breland trade.
April 11, 2011: The Lynx acquired a first-round pick in the 2012 Draft from the Washington Mystics in exchange for Nicky Anosike.
May 27, 2011: The Lynx swapped third-round picks in the 2012 Draft with the New York Liberty as part of the Quanitra Hollingsworth transaction.
January 23: The Lynx re-signed Jessica Adair.
January 26: The Lynx re-signed Taj McWilliams-Franklin.
February 2: The Lynx traded Alexis Hornbuckle to the Phoenix Mercury in exchange for a second-round pick in the 2013 Draft.
February 10: The Lynx re-signed Candice Wiggins.
February 13: The Lynx signed Erin Thorn.
February 28: The Lynx traded Charde Houston and the 24th pick in the 2012 Draft to the Phoenix Mercury in exchange for the 18th pick in the 2012 Draft.
April 25: The Lynx signed Queralt Casas, Jasmine Lee, and Porsche Poole.
April 26: The Lynx signed Tavelyn James and draft pick Julie Wojta.
April 29: The Lynx signed Brittany Rayburn.
May 2: The Lynx signed draft picks Devereaux Peters and Kayla Standish.
May 6: The Lynx waived Jasmine Lee, Tavelyn James, and Kayla Standish.
May 11: The Lynx waived Brittany Rayburn.
May 16: The Lynx waived Queralt Casas and Julie Wojta.
July 10: The Lynx signed Julie Wojta to a 7-day contract as an injury replacement.

Trades

Personnel changes

Additions

Subtractions

Roster

Depth

Season summary

First Half of Season

Expectations were high for the Lynx as they opened the 2012 season. The team returned all five starters from their 2011 championship season, including four all-stars. Those expectations were matched through the early part of the season, as the team set the WNBA record with 10 consecutive wins to start the season, before losing to Seattle on June 17. The team then won two consecutive games to run their record to 12-1.

July proved to be a difficult month. The team lost three straight to start the month, and lost forwards Devereaux Peters and Rebekkah Brunson to injuries. The team signed guard Julie Wojta, who had been drafted by the team but cut after training camp, to a 7-day contract to provide depth. The Lynx rebounded by winning back-to-back games over the Tulsa Shock, and went into the Summer Olympic Break with a 15-4 record.

Olympics

Three members of the Lynx—Seimone Augustus, Maya Moore, and Lindsay Whalen—were members of the United States women's national basketball team for the 2012 Summer Olympics. The three players were the most contributed by any WNBA squad. The team won gold during the games, the second medal for Augustus, and the first each for Moore and Whalen.

Injuries

Seimone Augustus missed two games in June with a strained quadriceps muscle. Jessica Adair underwent arthroscopic surgery on her knee on June 21. Devereaux Peters and Rebekkah Brunson both went out with injuries in July.

Second Half of Season

The Lynx returned to action on August 17, 2012, beating the Washington Mystics 98-69. They won their second game back, beating Tulsa 83-59 to clinch a berth in the playoffs. It was the earliest in a season the Lynx had ever clinched a playoff spot.

The Lynx tied a WNBA record on September 7, when they came back from a 25-point deficit to defeat the Atlanta Dream in double overtime.

The Lynx did not lose until September 11, when they fell to the Chicago Sky. By that point, the Lynx were comfortably ahead in the Western Conference standings; the team ultimately won the top overall seed in the playoffs, and matched a franchise record with 27 wins.

Season standings

Schedule

Preseason

|- align="center" bgcolor="bbffbb"
| 1 || Thu 10 || 7:00 || @ Connecticut || CPTV-S || 87-85 || Augustus (12) || PetersWojta (7) || Whalen (5) || Mohegan Sun Arena  4,835 || 1-0
|- align="center" bgcolor="bbffbb"
| 2 || Tue 15 || 1:00 || Chicago ||  || 82-61 || Wright (14) || Brunson (7) || Whalen (8) || University of Minnesota  4,102 || 2-0
|-

Regular season

|- align="center" bgcolor="bbffbb"
| 1 || Sun 20 || 12:30 || Phoenix || ABC || 105-83 || Augustus (19) || Brunson (9) || McWilliams-FranklinWhalenWright (5) || Target Center  12,611 || 1-0
|- align="center" bgcolor="bbffbb"
| 2 || Tue 22 || 7:00 || @ New York ||  || 80-62 || Augustus (22) || McWilliams-Franklin (11) || Moore (7) || Prudential Center  5,411 || 2-0
|- align="center" bgcolor="bbffbb"
| 3 || Thu 24 || 8:00 || Los Angeles ||  || 92-84 || Augustus (25) || McWilliams-Franklin (8) || McWilliams-Franklin (4) || Target Center  7,923 || 3-0
|- align="center" bgcolor="bbffbb"
| 4 || Sun 27 || 7:00 || Seattle || FS-N || 84-71 || Moore (19) || Brunson (7) || Whalen (8) || Target Center  7,832 || 4-0
|- align="center" bgcolor="bbffbb"
| 5 || Wed 30 || 7:00 || @ Washington || CSN-MA || 79-77 || BrunsonMoore (16) || Brunson (9) || Whalen (7) || Verizon Center  8,131 || 5-0
|-

|- align="center" bgcolor="bbffbb"
| 6 || Fri 1 || 7:00 || @ Connecticut || CPTV-S || 85-72 || Augustus (23) || Brunson (13) || Whalen (8) || Mohegan Sun Arena  7,249 || 6-0
|- align="center" bgcolor="bbffbb"
| 7 || Sun 3 || 7:00 || San Antonio || FS-NFS-SW || 83-79 || BrunsonMoore (17) || BrunsonWhalen (8) || Whalen (7) || Target Center  7,942 || 7-0
|- align="center" bgcolor="bbffbb"
| 8 || Wed 6 || 8:00 || Seattle ||  || 79-55 || McWilliams-Franklin (17) || Wiggins (6) || Whalen (5) || Target Center  8,263 || 8-0
|- align="center" bgcolor="bbffbb"
| 9 || Sat 9 || 8:00 || @ Tulsa ||  || 93-73 || Moore (26) || BrunsonMcWilliams-Franklin (6) || Whalen (10) || BOK Center  5,113 || 9-0
|- align="center" bgcolor="bbffbb"
| 10 || Fri 15 || 10:00 || @ Phoenix ||  || 78-60 || Whalen (29) || HarrisMoore (7) || AugustusWright (3) || US Airways Center  7,394 || 10-0
|- align="center" bgcolor="ffbbbb"
| 11 || Sun 17 || 9:00 || @ Seattle || || 62-65 || Moore (14) || Brunson (11) || BrunsonMcWilliams-FranklinWhalen (4)  || KeyArena  8,349  || 10-1
|- align="center" bgcolor="bbffbb"
| 12 || Thu 21 || 8:00 || New York ||  || 102-70 || Augustus (26) || BrunsonMoore (10) || Augustus (8) || Target Center  9,050 || 11-1
|- align="center" bgcolor="bbffbb"
| 13 || Sat 23 || 12:30 || Chicago || ESPN || 79-67 || Whalen (25) || Brunson (7) || Whalen (8) || Target Center  9,267 || 12-1
|- align="center" bgcolor="bbffbb"
| 14 || Wed 27 || 8:00 || Phoenix || FS-N || 96-80 || AugustusBrunson (16) || Brunson (13) || MooreWhalen (6) || Target Center  9,674 || 13-1
|-

|- align="center" bgcolor="ffbbbb"
| 15 || Sun 1 || 3:00 || @ San Antonio ||  || 84-93 || Wright (18) || Brunson (10) || Brunson (4) || AT&T Center  6,568 || 13-2 
|- align="center" bgcolor="ffbbbb"
| 16 || Thu 5 || 3:00 || @ Los Angeles || NBATVTWC101 || 90-96 || Augustus (18) || BrunsonMcWilliams-Franklin (9) || McWilliams-Franklin (6) || Staples Center  11,256 || 13-3
|- align="center" bgcolor="ffbbbb"
| 17 || Sat 7 || 8:00 || Connecticut || FS-NCPTV-S || 80-86 || Moore (19) || BrunsonMcWilliams-Franklin (8) || Whalen (5) || Target Center  10,882 || 13-4
|- align="center" bgcolor="bbffbb"
| 18 || Tue 10 || 12:30 || @ Tulsa ||  || 107-86 || Wiggins (25) || McWilliams-Franklin (8) || Whalen (7) || BOK Center  6,012 || 14-4
|- align="center" bgcolor="bbffbb"
| 19 || Thu 12 || 12:00 || Tulsa || FS-N || 89-72 || Moore (28) || McWilliams-Franklin (12) || Whalen (8) || Target Center  15,318 || 15-4  
|-
| colspan="11" align="center" valign="middle" | Summer Olympic break
|-

|-
| colspan="11" align="center" valign="middle" | Summer Olympic break
|- align="center" bgcolor="bbffbb"
| 20 || Fri 17 || 8:00 || Washington || NBATV || 98-69 || Augustus (20) || Brunson (7) || Whalen (9) || Target Center  10,933 || 16-4
|- align="center" bgcolor="bbffbb"
| 21 || Sun 19 || 7:00 || Tulsa || || 83-59 || Moore (22) || Moore (10) || Moore (6) || Target Center  10,223 || 17-4
|- align="center" bgcolor="bbffbb"
| 22 || Tue 21 || 10:00 || @ Seattle || ESPN2 || 86-73 || Augustus (22) || Brunson (14) || Whalen (9) || KeyArena  6,169 || 18-4
|- align="center" bgcolor="bbffbb"
| 23 || Sat 25 || 7:00 || @ Atlanta || ESPN2 || 84-74 || Augustus (23) || Brunson (13) || Whalen (8) || Philips Arena  7,224 || 19-4
|- align="center" bgcolor="bbffbb"
| 24 || Tue 28 || 8:00 || San Antonio || NBATV || 96-84 (OT) || AugustusMcWilliams-Franklin (19) || Brunson (20) || Whalen (8) || Target Center  8,532 || 20-4
|- align="center" bgcolor="bbffbb"
| 25 || Fri 31 || 8:00 || Tulsa || NBATV || 92-83 || BrunsonMooreWhalen (19) || Brunson (11) || Moore (8) || Target Center  9,213 || 21-4
|-

|- align="center" bgcolor="bbffbb"
| 26 || Tue 4 || 8:00 || Los Angeles || NBATV || 88-77 || AugustusMoore (23) || Moore (9) || McWilliams-Franklin (5) || Target Center  8,123 || 22-4
|- align="center" bgcolor="bbffbb"
| 27 || Fri 7 || 8:00 || Atlanta || FS-NSSO || 97-93 (2OT) || Moore (23) || Brunson (18) || Whalen (5) || Target Center  9,308 || 23-4
|- align="center" bgcolor="bbffbb"
| 28 || Sun 9 || 3:00 || @ San Antonio || NBATV || 81-62 || Moore (18) || BrunsonMoore (12) || Moore (6) || AT&T Center  6,025 || 24-4
|- align="center" bgcolor="ffbbbb"
| 29 || Tue 11 || 8:00 || @ Chicago || CN100 || 70-83 || Moore (18) || BrunsonWright (5) || Moore (7) || Allstate Arena  4,296 || 24-5
|- align="center" bgcolor="bbffbb"
| 30 || Fri 14 || 7:00 || @ Indiana ||  || 66-64 || Moore (15) || Moore (7) || Moore (5) || Bankers Life Fieldhouse  8,819 || 25-5
|- align="center" bgcolor="bbffbb"
| 31 || Mon 17 || 8:00 || Indiana || NBATVFS-NFS-I || 86-79 || Moore (29) || Whalen (8) || Whalen (6) || Target Center  9,523 || 26-5
|- align="center" bgcolor="ffbbbb"
| 32 || Thu 20 || 10:30 || @ Los Angeles || NBATVTWC101 || 76-92 || Wright (19) || Peters (13) || Thorn (5) || Staples Center  10,217 || 26-6
|- align="center" bgcolor="bbffbb"
| 33 || Fri 21 || 10:00 || @ Phoenix || NBATVFS-N || 89-66 || Moore (21) || Peters (9) || Peters (6) || US Airways Center  7,217 || 27-6
|- align="center" bgcolor="ffbbbb"
| 34 || Sun 23 || 3:00 || @ San Antonio ||  || 84-99 || Augustus (18) || Peters (10) || Whalen (5) || AT&T Center  8,084 || 27-7
|-

| All games are viewable on WNBA LiveAccess or ESPN3.com

Postseason

|- align="center" bgcolor="bbffbb"
| 1 || September 28 || 9:00 || Seattle || ESPN2 || 78-70 || Whalen (20) || Brunson (11) || Whalen (6) || Target Center  9,213 || 1-0 
|- align="center" bgcolor="ffbbbb"
| 2 || September 30 || 9:00 || @ Seattle || ESPN || 79-86 (2OT) || Brunson (20) || Brunson(15) || Whalen (5) || KeyArena  8,479 || 1-1
|- align="center" bgcolor="bbffbb"
| 3 || October 2 || 9:00 || Seattle || ESPN2 || 73-72 || Augustus (21) || Brunson (9) || McWilliams-Franklin (4) || Target Center  8,023 || 2-1
|-

|- align="center" bgcolor="bbffbb"
| 1 || October 4 || 8:00 || Los Angeles || ESPN2 || 94-77 || Moore (20) || Brunson (10) || Augustus (7) || Target Center  8,513 || 1-0
|- align="center" bgcolor="bbffbb"
| 2 || October 7 || 3:30 || @ Los Angeles || ABC || 80-79 || Augustus (21) || Brunson (10) || McWilliams-FranklinWhalen (5) || Staples Center  10,791 || 2-0
|-

|- align="center" bgcolor="ffbbbb"
| 1 || October 14 || 8:00 || Indiana || ESPN2 || 70-76 || Augustus (23) || BrunsonMoore (10) || Whalen (4) || Target Center  14,322 || 0-1
|- align="center" bgcolor="bbffbb"
| 2 || October 17 || 8:00 || Indiana || ESPN || 83-71 || Augustus (27) || Brunson (7) || McWilliams-FranklinMooreWhalen (4) || Target Center  13,478 || 1-1
|- align="center" bgcolor="ffbbbb"
| 3 || October 19 || 8:00 || @ Indiana || ESPN2 || 59-76 || Brunson (12) || Brunson (9) || Wiggins (3) || Bankers Life Fieldhouse  18,165 || 1-2
|- align="center" bgcolor="ffbbbb"
| 4 || October 21 || 8:00 || @ Indiana|| ESPN2 || 78-87 || Whalen (22) || Augustus (7) || Whalen (8) || Bankers Life Fieldhouse  15,213 || 1-3
|-

Statistics

Regular season

Awards and honors
Maya Moore was named WNBA Western Conference Player of the Week for the week of August 16, 2012
Maya Moore was named WNBA Western Conference Player of the Week for the week of September 3, 2012
Taj McWilliams-Franklin became the WNBA's all-time leading offensive rebounder
WNBA record for most consecutive wins to begin a season (10)
Team record for highest field goal percentage in a single game (.695), July 10 vs. Tulsa
Lindsay Whalen finished as a Peak Performer, averaging 5.4 assists.

References

External links

Minnesota
Minnesota Lynx seasons
Western Conference (WNBA) championship seasons
Minnesota Lynx